Admiral Sir Arthur Allan Morison Duff, KCB, JP, DL (19 April 1874 – 5 April 1952) was a Royal Navy officer.

Duff was the son of General A. G. Duff.

In 1913, Duff was given command of the light cruiser HMS Birmingham. Duff was in command of the ship when, on 9 August 1914, she rammed the German submarine U-15 off Fair Isle, cutting her in two, becoming the first German submarine to be sunk in the First World War. In 1916, Duff later commanded Birmingham at the Battle of Dogger Bank and the Battle of Jutland.

Duff was promoted to KCB in the 1929 New Year Honours. He was promoted to Admiral on 8 May 1930 and was placed on the Retired List on 15 May.

References 
 http://www.dreadnoughtproject.org/tfs/index.php/Arthur_Allan_Morison_Duff

1874 births
1952 deaths
Royal Navy admirals
Royal Navy admirals of World War I
Knights Commander of the Order of the Bath
English justices of the peace
Deputy Lieutenants